Cichla temensis, the speckled pavon, speckled peacock bass, painted pavon, or three-barred peacock bass, is a very large South American cichlid, and a prized food and game fish.

Range
C. temensis is native to the Orinoco and Rio Negro basins, as well as several smaller rivers in the central Amazon (Uatumã, Preto da Eva, Puraquequara, and Tefé), in Brazil, Venezuela and Guyana. In its native range, it is essentially restricted to blackwater rivers and their tributaries.

Introduction attempts have been made outside its native range, but it has not managed to become established in Florida or Texas. In contrast, it has flourished in tropical Singapore and Malaysia.

Appearance

C. temensis resembles other peacock bass species, but is generally more elongated and slender in shape. Adults are highly variable in colour pattern, which has historically caused some problems, with some speculating that the variants were separate species or males/females. Only in 2012 was it firmly established that dark individuals with a dense light-speckled pattern are the nonbreeders, while breeding adults are more golden-olive and lack the pale speckles, but have three broad, dark bars on their bodies. During the breeding season, some males also develop a bulbous forehead. Between the two extremes are several intermediate patterns. No other peacock bass species is known to have such extreme variations among the adults.

References

temensis
Cichlid fish of South America
Fish described in 1821
Taxa named by Alexander von Humboldt